Dowty may refer to:
Dowty Group, a British aircraft equipment manufacturing business

People with the surname
Alan Dowty, international relations scholar
David Dowty, American linguist
George Dowty, British inventor and businessman

See also
 Doughty, a surname
Dowty Rotol, a British company specialising in aircraft propellers
Messier-Dowty, originally a landing gear joint venture between Snecma and Dowty